Nadapa is a village in Bhuj Taluka in the Kutch District of Gujarat. It lies 35 km from Bhuj, the Taluka and District Headquarters of Kutch. This is an Ahir dominated village.

History

References

Villages in Kutch district